is a 1997 Japanese video game for the arcade and the Sega Saturn. It is a fighting game developed by Atlus, and the fourth in the Gouketsuji Ichizoku (Power Instinct) series. The game has artwork and designs by famed artist Range Murata. The game has a darker tone and is set in the future with only two characters from the prior games returning. Though the game's art and visual style was praised, critics were more lukewarm about the overall gameplay, giving it average scores.

Plot 
The game is set 20 years after the last game in the series, and is set in the year 2015.

Gameplay
Oume and Otane are the only returning characters from previous games.

A tag system is introduced, taken from Gogetsuji Gaiden: Saikyou Densetsu. Each match features four characters. This gameplay mechanic is similar to X-Men vs Street Fighter, where the player picks two characters at a time and changes them at will. Also, the player can throw any other character, including their partner.

The character Bristol can summon demons which are the same as the ones that have appeared in the Shin Megami Tensei series.

After beating the game, a gallery mode can be unlocked showing concept art for the game, including some for characters who didn't make the final version of the game.

The game features up to four players by using the Sega Multi-tap.

Development and release
It is the fourth game in the Gouketsuji Ichizoku series. The series is known as Power Instinct in the West.

Artist Range Murata worked on the game and prior entries in the series, also worked on the Saturn title Wachenröder.

The game uses the 1MB or 4MB RAM expansion cart. The game was sold with and without and the 1MB cart.

The arcade version of the game was shown at the JAMMA 96 trade show at the Atlus booth alongside a 3D fighter known as Ultimate Domain. The arcade version used the Sega ST-V arcade board.

The game was released for the Sega Saturn on May 19, 1997 only in Japan. The Saturn version has issues with low frame rate and long loading times.

Reception

Brazilian magazine Super GamePower gave it a 3.0 out of 5.

GameSpot gave it 6.3 out of 10. Viz Media's online magazine J-Pop gave it 3/5.

Three reviewers for GameFan gave the game scores of 70, 80, 65. One reviewer was highly critical of the game, noting that the extra 3MB of RAM the extra memory cart brought should have resulted in a better game, and noted the constant loading times, and animations as the same quality as Street Fighter II. Another reviewer praised the art and cast of characters, but said that the pace of the game was rather slow and the gameplay was "not bad". The last reviewer was more positive about the game, while noting that the animation quality was lacking, and the Super Moves system was easy to abuse. Despite this however, they praised the character designs, calling them "stunningly beautiful" and specifically calling out Solis' outfit and praised the gameplay calling it "wacky".

Three reviewers for the Japanese Sega Saturn Magazine reviewed the game, and gave it okay marks. In an import review for the English Saturn Power magazine, they praised the game saying "Groove on Fight dares to be different and looks and plays well enough to get away with it".

In 2003, Edge magazine's Retro special issue called the game derivative, and criticized the loading times and low frame-rate. Despite this they said it was a decent alternative to Capcom fighting games. In 2006, Play magazine contributing editor Eric Patterson listed the game's cover art, along with River City Ransom, as his favorite game covers of all time.

Notes

References

1997 video games
Arcade video games
Fighting games
Japan-exclusive video games
Sega Saturn games
Video games developed in Japan
Video games featuring female protagonists
Video game sequels